Hach'a, also written as Hacha or Hachaa or Hechea (from Iraqi Arabic هَچَع meaning "lying down"), with or without the Arabic definite article Al- or El-, is the name for an Iraqi poetic, musical style and its accompanying expressive dance. This poetic, musical and dance tradition originated in the North of Iraq but now is mostly popular in Southern Iraq, especially in the Roma or Gypsy communities of Iraq known as Kawliya, which is also the name of the accompanying dance.

The poetry 
Hacha'a poetry, also known as Tajleebah, from Arabic تجليبة which means bringing back, is about bringing back emotional things like memories, a lost love, mending a broken heart, and so on.  Hacha'a poetry is sung in the Hacha'a mode, and describes the suffering of love. The audience hand-claps and interjects verbally with "hacha'a", meaning to lie down, in an encouragement to be finally rid of all the suffering by lying down, whether alone or with the loved one.

The music 
Hacha'a has its own mode called the Hacha'a mode of Iraqi music. The most distinctive sound is that of the drum known as Khishba, Zanboor or Kasour, which has narrow tube-shaped body made of wood, with a fish-skin head glued on top. The head is moistened and the drum is knocked very fast with both hands to get a rapid-fire sound characteristic, many beats faster than the main beat of the song. Iraqi traditional or modern musical instruments can be used.

The dance 
The Hach'a accompanying dance is an expressive dance that emphasizes complex movements of the hands and neck, with some hip movements This dance is a solo or group dance for women mostly, with sometimes a male drummer who dances circling the women. There are special moves for women with longer hair since they can swing and flail their hair around wildly in the dance.

The Hacha'a dance is also known as  

 the Agraba, from the Arabic عقربة which means scorpion because of the perceived similarities between this dance's moves and how the Iraqi scorpion moves.

 the Kawliya dance because of its association with the Iraqi Roma community.

The following are some features of the Hach'a dance style: 

 Hair swinging: The dancer's untied hair is thrown circularly in the air around her and also right and left, violently to the drum rhythms.
 Hair sweeping: The dancer kneels closer to the floor and rubs her hair, gently sweeping the floor with it.
 Awakening the earth: The dancer repeatedly jumps and strikes the floor with her feet as if struggling to wake up the sleeping, careless ground, a reminiscent of ancient Mesopotamian earth fertility rites. 
 Shimmies: Rapid shaking motion of the head, shoulders and hips. 
 Daggers: Sometimes the dancer holds, or pretends to hold, a dagger in each hand and simulates stabbing herself with them by rhythmically pointing them towards her heart and sides. These simulated blows signify the pain of love and separation, as well as the sacrifice of the beloved. 
 Finger snaps: two-handed finger snaps are commonly used. 
 Costumes: The typical costume is a much less conservative version of a  traditional Iraqi village girl costume, with some decoration.

See also 
Arabic poetry
Music of Iraq
Ethnic, regional, and folk dances of Iraq

References 

Arab dance